Frank J. Leveroni (September 10, 1879, Genoa, Italy – August 1, 1948) was an Italian-American judge.

Biography
"In 1905, Frank J. Leveroni was appointed a special justice of the Boston Juvenile Court, the first man of Italian descent to hold a judicial position in Massachusetts." This fact was cited in a Worcester Telegram op-ed piece dated Sunday, October 30, 2005, entitled "Professor Tracks Ascent of State’s Italian-Americans", written by Albert B. Southwick.

Leveroni was appointed a special justice of the juvenile court of Boston and began serving in the juvenile court system in 1906 (according to the website BostonHistoryCollaborative.org). Leveroni was one individual who helped found and support the juvenile justice system in the United States and he was a philanthropist of the first order. He is widely known throughout the Boston area for founding the Home for Italian Children in Jamaica Plain, Massachusetts, an institution that stands to this day (currently known as the Italian Home for Children, a private school mainly for special education, with 45% children of color). Judge Leveroni founded this orphanage to support the children he encountered on the streets and in the juvenile justice system. It was his way of giving back to the community.

References

Massachusetts state court judges
Italian emigrants to the United States
1879 births
1948 deaths
American people of Italian descent